Yuzhny is a rural locality (a settlement) in Danilovskoye Rural Settlement, Melenkovsky District, Vladimir Oblast, Russia. The population was 125 as of 2010. There are 5 streets.

Geography 
Yuzhny is located 30 km west from Melenki (the district's administrative centre) by road. Pichugino is the nearest rural locality.

References 

Rural localities in Melenkovsky District